Brigadier General Asaminew Tsige (1958/1959 – 24 June 2019) was an Ethiopian general who served as chief of the Amhara Region security forces during part of 2019. He had previously been serving a life sentence in relation to an alleged coup attempt staged by Ginbot 7. During his imprisonment, he was allegedly tortured and lost sight in one eye. He was released in 2018 and restored to his prior rank and pension.

Asaminew was part of the Amhara people, which is Ethiopia's second largest ethnic group. He had been known for his hard line ethnic nationalism and was particularly popular among a segment of young Amhara. After his release from prison and appointment to a government post, he has advocated for more autonomy for Amhara and went as far as calling members of his ethnic groups to arm themselves and join local militias. Though the International Crisis Group said that his activities helped the rise of the National Movement of Amhara (NaMA), which emerged as a challenger to the Amhara Democratic Party, NaMA was established before the coming of Gen. Asaminew to the government power.

Asaminew was accused of being behind an alleged attempted coup in the Amhara Region in 2019. The President of Amhara region Ambachew Mekonnen was killed during the alleged attempt. In a related event, the Chief of Staff of the Ethiopian National Defense Force, Gen. Se'are Mekonnen, and his aide, Maj. Gen. Gizae Aberra, were assassinated by a bodyguard, the office of Ethiopian Prime Minister Dr. Abiy Ahmed said. Se'are and Ambachew were close allies of the prime minister. Following the alleged attempted coup, he was on the run, with his whereabouts unknown, until he was shot dead by police on 24 June, after 36 hours at large, Ethiopian state television announced.

References

2019 deaths
Ethiopian generals
Deaths by firearm in Ethiopia
Place of death missing
Place of birth missing
People shot dead by law enforcement officers
People killed in the Ethiopian civil conflict (2018–present)
Year of birth uncertain